is a city located in Yamagata Prefecture, Japan. , the city had an estimated population of 15,237, and a population density of 40.9 persons per km2.

Geography
Obanazawa is located in a mountain valley northeast Yamagata Prefecture, bordered by the Mogami River to the west and the Ōu Mountains to the east.

Neighboring municipalities
Yamagata Prefecture
Higashine
Murayama
Ōishida
Mogami
Funagata
Miyagi Prefecture
Kami
Sendai

Climate
Obanazawa has a Humid continental climate (Köppen climate classification Cfa) with large seasonal temperature differences, with warm to hot (and often humid) summers and cold (sometimes severely cold) winters. Precipitation is significant throughout the year, but is heaviest from August to October. The city is noted for its very heavy snowfall in winter.

Demographics
Per Japanese census data, the population of Obanazawa peaked around 1950 and has declined considerably since then.

History
The area of present-day Obanazawa was part of ancient Dewa Province. After the start of the Meiji period, the area became part of Kitamurayama District, Yamagata Prefecture. The village of Obanazawa was established on April 1, 1889 with the establishment of the modern municipalities system, and was raised to town status on July 26, 1897. It was made a city on April 10, 1959.

Obanazawa is the origin of one version of the Dontsuki song, the 'Hanagasa Dance Song', a song sung in many parts of Yamagata Prefecture.

Government
Obanazawa has a mayor-council form of government with a directly elected mayor and a unicameral city legislature of 14 members. The city contributes one member to the Yamagata Prefectural Assembly.  In terms of national politics, the city is part of Yamagata District 2 of the lower house of the Diet of Japan.

Economy
The economy of Obanazawa is based on agriculture and forestry. In agriculture, Obanazawa is best known for its watermelons.

Education
Obanazawa has four public elementary schools and two public middle schools operated by the city government and one public high school operated by the Yamagata Prefectural Board of Education.

Transportation

Railway
 East Japan Railway Company -  Ōu Main Line
  (However, central Obanazawa is also served by Ōishida Station in neighboring Ōishida).

Highway
  – Obanazawa Interchange

Local attractions
Ginzan Onsen
Nobesawa Ginzan, a National Historic Site

Noted people
Kotonowaka Terumasa, sumo wrestler
Norio Sasaki, Japan national women's soccer team head coach

References

External links
 
Official Website 

 
Cities in Yamagata Prefecture